Shararat in Hindi-Urdu means "mischief". It may refer to:

 Shararat (1944 film), 1944 Indian Hindi language film directed by Kishore Sahu
 Shararat (1959 film), 1959 Indian Hindi language film directed by H. S. Rawail and starring Raaj Kumar, Kishore Kumar and Meena Kumari
 Shararat (1972 film), 1972 Indian Hindi language film directed by Manmohan Desai starring Biswajeet and Mumtaz
 Shararat (1990 film), 1990 Indian Hindi language film starring Rakesh Roshan
 Shararat (2002 film), 2002 Indian Hindi language film starring Abhishek Bachchan and Hrishitaa Bhatt
 Shararat (2003 film), 2003 Pakistani Urdu language film starring Mehr Hassan and Moammar Rana
 Shararat (TV series), Indian Hindi language sitcom